The World RX of Belgium was a Rallycross event held in Belgium for the FIA World Rallycross Championship. The event made its debut in the 2014 season, at the Circuit Jules Tacheny Mettet in the town of Mettet, Wallonia. From the 2019 season, the event will beheld at Circuit de Spa-Francorchamps and has been renamed the Spa World RX of Benelux.

Past winners

References

External links

Belgium
Auto races in Belgium
Sport in Namur (province)